Malim Nawar is a small town in Kampar District, Perak, Malaysia.

References

Kampar District
Towns in Perak